Steinsfurt is a village in southwestern Germany, in the Rhine Neckar Area of the Bundesland Baden-Württemberg between Heidelberg and Heilbronn in the district Rhein-Neckar. It is one of the 13 Stadtteile of Sinsheim, of which it is part since 1973. It has a total population of 3,269 (as of December 2017).

Tourist attractions
Steinsfurts's main tourist attraction is the Sinsheim Auto & Technik Museum, featuring many of historic vehicles.  It attracts over 1 million visitors per year. In 1989, a trade fair area was established that features all kinds of industrial and popular events.

Steinsfurt has restored its charming nineteenth-century synagogue.

Stadium 
On September 19, 2006, the mayor of Sinsheim announced that the Rhein-Neckar-Arena would be built in the suburb of Steinsfurt, not far from the Sinsheim Auto & Technik Museum, for other suburb, Hoffenheim's football club 1899 Hoffenheim. The €40 million stadium, built by Dietmar Hopp, a cofounder and major share holder of software giant SAP and chief investor in 1899 Hoffenheim, built the stadium which seats 30,000.

See also
Hoffenheim

References

External links

Villages in Baden-Württemberg
Rhein-Neckar-Kreis
Baden
Former municipalities in Baden-Württemberg